El Infierno is a 2010 Mexican Neo-western crime film produced by Bandidos Films, directed by Luis Estrada and following the line of La ley de Herodes. The film is a political satire about drug trafficking, organized crime, and the Mexican Drug War. It has been a critical and commercial success in Mexico and was nominated for the 25th Goya Awards for Best Spanish Language Foreign Film. The film has enjoyed a cult following mostly by Mexican audiences.

El Infierno is rated NC-17 by the MPAA for intense graphic violence and explicit sexual content. In Australia, the movie is rated MA-15+.

Plot
The story begins with Benjamin García, nicknamed as "Benny" (Damián Alcázar), saying farewell to his mother and younger brother to migrate to the United States. 20 years later, he is deported back to Mexico, where he finds a bleak reality where an economic crisis and a wave of crime and violence hit the country as a result of the War on Drugs.

His mother and godfather tell Benny his younger brother was killed on strange circumstances, leaving his wife and son; not too long after, Benny meets them and feels attracted towards the widow Guadalupe Solís (Elizabeth Cervantes), making a promise in front of his brother's grave to help her and his nephew. Some time later, he meets his childhood friend Eufemio "El Cochiloco" Mata (Joaquín Cosío), who has become part of a drug cartel. Talking about it he finds out his brother worked along with him in the "Los Reyes del Norte" cartel, being known as Pedro "El Diablo" García, but he was killed by the rival cartel "Los Panchos".

Days later, Benny, now in a relationship with Guadalupe, finds himself in trouble after knowing his nephew was arrested for robbery and will only walk free with a bribe of 50,000 pesos (about 4000 USD in 2010). Benny asks Cochiloco for help and accepts joining the cartel where he meets the boss, Don José Reyes (Ernesto Gómez Cruz) and his son Jesús "El J.R." Reyes. He's accepted into the cartel, not before being reminded about the rules: Honesty, loyalty, and absolute silence. Benny seems content, but after witnessing the torture and killing of "La Cucaracha", who was a whistleblower for the federal police, he starts to doubt himself in front of the horrors he must commit. In spite of it, Guadalupe convinces him to stay, claiming they "could get used to anything except starving".

After this, Benny starts to adapt and progress in the cartel, but soon the rival cartel grows stronger and begins a major dispute, for which Los Reyes employ ex-military mercenaries as new members. J.R. divides them in three groups and gives them separate missions.

Soon Benny receives a call from Cochiloco saying he's in trouble. Someone had betrayed them and told the rival cartel their location, with J.R. killed in the ambush as he was having sex with two of the mercenaries. Since J.R. was probably hiding his homosexuality from his father, Cochiloco decided to lie to Don José about his death, which causes him to doubt the loyalty of his subordinate. The day of the funeral, Don José looks at Cochiloco with distrust and resentment, who he believes is the culprit of his son's death. He then orders another member known as "El Sargento" to kill Cochiloco's eldest son. The latter, filled with rage, goes against Don José for revenge, but dies off screen in his attempt.

After all this, Don José offers the remaining members a large reward to kill his brother Don Francisco "Pancho" Reyes, his nephews Los Panchos, and whoever gave the location of his son's squad. They slaughter the rival cartel and discover the traitor was a young man from the same town: Benjamin "El Diablito" García, Benny's nephew, but the other members don't recognize him. Angry and nervous, Benny questions his nephew about his reasons, who in tears confesses he did it because he found out it was Los Reyes who killed his father, showing the gold chain he always wore, the one Benny gifted him when he left for the United States.

Benny, with more questions than before, begins to search for the truth, interrogating his partner "El Huasteco" who reveals the truth at gunpoint: Don José personally tortured and killed Pedro by castrating him for having slept with Don Jose's wife. Between laughs and rage he realizes the other members do know his nephew, and it was a matter of time before they found out about his involvement in the ambush. Benny muzzles Huasteco and goes back to take his nephew to safety and get him out of the country. But on the way back, Benny receives a call from Guadalupe warning him Los Reyes already know what's going on and urges him to abandon the town. Benny resorts to the federal police to testify against Don José for protection, but all too soon he realizes they're involved with Los Reyes as well. After being tortured he attempts to save himself from being brought to Don José by bribing to policemen who let him escape, offering them money and drugs.

When they arrive at his brother's grave, Benny shows the policemen the bribe, which was hidden in a small niche on the grave. But as they are distracted, Benny takes out a gun to shoot the agents, however, he misses and one of them shoots back. Benny is left for dead and buried in a shallow grave next to his brother's, knowing Don José had ordered them to bring Benny alive for punishment. The morning after, Benny wakes up and gets out of the grave just to find out Guadalupe had been murdered. Badly hurt, he decides to get away to recover. Months later, Don José becomes the county governor, where Benny decides to kill off Los Reyes while they celebrate Independence Day, mowing them down with an AK-47, wiping out the cartel.

In an extra scene only available in the DVD and Blu-ray editions, Benny is at his brother's and Guadalupe's graves, saying farewell to them and that he's going to Arizona to make a new life with his nephew. Before leaving, an unknown young man goes up to him to ask for a cigarette, and after a few words he reveals he's Don Francisco's grandson, before taking out a gun and shooting down Benny. The final scene shows Diablito in front of the three graves, crossing himself with a smile on his face, and leaving in his van to later arrive in a drug warehouse to kill Don Francisco's grandson.

Cast
Damián Alcázar as Benny García
Joaquín Cosio as Cochiloco
Isela Vega as Doña Rosaura
Ernesto Gómez Cruz as don José Reyes/don Pancho Reyes
María Rojo as doña Mary Reyes
Elizabeth Cervantes as Lupe
Daniel Giménez Cacho as Captain Ramírez
Jorge Zárate as Huasteco
Salvador Sánchez as don Rogaciano, the godfather
 as Mamá García
Kristian Ferrer as Benjamín, the nephew
Dagoberto Gama as Sargento
Mauricio Isaac as J.R. Reyes
Alejandro Calva as police chief
Emilio Guerrero as Major
Silverio Palacios as Cucaracha/Pánfilo, the twin brothers
Tenoch Huerta as El Diablo
Jen Taylor as El Corinne
Mario Almada as El Texano

Awards
Havana Film Festival, Grand Coral – First Prize
San Diego Latino Film Festival, Corazón Award (Best Film)
Nominated for the 25th Goya Awards for the Goya Award for Best Spanish Language Foreign Film

References

External links
 
 

2010 films
2010 black comedy films
2010s crime comedy films
Mexican satirical films
Mexican black comedy films
Mexican crime comedy films
2010s Spanish-language films
Best Picture Ariel Award winners
Estudios Churubusco films
Films scored by Michael Brook
Films about Mexican drug cartels
Films directed by Luis Estrada
Films set in Mexico
2010 comedy films
2010s Mexican films